Robert Parks-Valletta is an Emmy award winning American actor, producer, TV host, best selling author and philanthropist. He is known for his recurring roles on The Young and the Restless, ‘’Staycation’’ and Vanderpump Rules, and producing and hosting the local lifestyle shows, Destination series. He has produced over 400 episodes of network television. He is the younger brother of supermodel and actress, Amber Valletta.

Life and career
Parks-Valletta was born and raised in San Diego, California. As an actor, he has appeared in over thirty network television shows and movies including Hawaii Five-0, The Young and the Restless, and NCIS: Los Angeles. As the co-owner and CEO of Circle 8 Productions, he produces and hosts the local lifestyle This Is series (This Is LA, This Is SF).

In 2009, Parks-Valletta founded the charity, Tag the World. The organization sells five sterling silver necklace tags to correspond to the five areas the charity supports: children, cancer, animals, Africa, and the environment. Purchasers choose what cause their money goes to and the tags raise awareness for the causes.

Parks-Valletta is the younger brother of Amber Valletta, a supermodel and actress. He is also known for his recurring appearance on the sixth season of the Bravo reality series Vanderpump Rules as Scheana Shay's boyfriend. They split at the end of 2017.

Filmography

Television

Film

References

External links

Year of birth missing (living people)
Living people
Male actors from San Diego
21st-century American male actors
American male television actors
American male film actors